Safer Sali (born 3 June 1946, in Veles, SFR Yugoslavia) is a former freestyle wrestler who competed in the 1972 Summer Olympics for Yugoslavia. He is of Albanian heritage.

References

External links
 

1946 births
Albanians in North Macedonia
Sportspeople from Veles, North Macedonia
Olympic wrestlers of Yugoslavia
Wrestlers at the 1972 Summer Olympics
Yugoslav male sport wrestlers
Macedonian male sport wrestlers
Living people
Mediterranean Games silver medalists for Yugoslavia
Competitors at the 1971 Mediterranean Games
Mediterranean Games medalists in wrestling